Mission: Impossible is a multimedia franchise.

Mission: Impossible may also refer to:

Film and television
 Mission: Impossible (1966 TV series),  a 1966–1973 American television series that was created and initially produced by Bruce Geller
 Mission: Impossible (1988 TV series), the 1988–1990 revival
 Mission: Impossible (film series), a series of films based upon the television series and starring Tom Cruise
 Mission: Impossible (film), 1996, first film in the series
 Mission: Impossible 2, 2000, second film in the series
 Mission: Impossible III, 2006, third film in the series
 Mission: Impossible – Ghost Protocol, 2011, fourth film in the series
 Mission: Impossible – Rogue Nation, 2015, fifth film in the series
 Mission: Impossible – Fallout, 2018, sixth film in the series
 Mission: Impossible – Dead Reckoning Part One, 2023, seventh film in the series
 Mission: Impossible – Dead Reckoning Part Two, 2024, eighth and final film in the series

Music
 Mission Impossible (JTQ album), a 1987 album by James Taylor Quartet
 Mission: Impossible (soundtrack), soundtrack to the 1996 film

Video games
 Mission: Impossible (1990 video game), a video game released for the Nintendo Entertainment System in 1990
 Mission: Impossible (1998 video game), a video game released for the Nintendo 64 in 1998 and ported to the PlayStation in 1999
 Mission: Impossible (2000 video game), a video game released for the Game Boy Color in 2000
 Mission: Impossible – Operation Surma, a video game released in 2003